Char Chokka Hoi Hoi was the official theme song of the 2014 ICC World Twenty20. It was released worldwide on 20 February 2014. Most of the song is in Bengali while some phrases in the opening lines are in English. The song is composed by famous Bangladeshi composer and artist Fuad al Muqtadir and has been sung by an ensemble of young vocalists, namely Dilshad Nahar Kona, Elita Karim, Pantha Kanai, Johan Alamgir, Sanvir Huda, Badhon Sarkar Puja and Kaushik Hossain Taposh.

The song is notable for its playful use of "Banglish".

Reception

The song received a mixed reaction in Bangladesh. It was widely criticized on the grounds that the lyrics and the subsequent music video in particular, did not adequately capture the essence of Bangladeshi culture and heritage. Despite this, the song became hugely popular in a short while due to its catchy tune and energetic beat. A competition held by the ICC, which invited university students from the three host cities (Dhaka, Chittagong and Sylhet) to create and submit their own dance videos, helped to further popularise the song.

The competition gave rise to flashmobs and performances in a number of major cities in Bangladesh. Eventually, the trend continued in other cities and even spread abroad to New York City, London, China and Russia well after the deadline for the competition had passed. Due to its now-global appeal and signature dance moves, Char Chokka Hoi Hoi has been compared to other dance trends such as 'Gangnam Style' and 'Harlem Shake'.

References

External links 
Official YouTube Video

Theme music
Bangladeshi songs
2014 ICC World Twenty20
Cricket events official songs and anthems
2014 songs